Chaudhry Ghulam Rasul Kamboh(1 May 1931 – 24 December 1991) was an educationist of Pakistan as well as a field hockey Olympic player. He was originally from Faisalabad District but later settled in Lahore. Rasool was an integral part of the Pakistani field hockey team from 1956 through 1963.

Education and career
Chaudhry Ghulam Rasool obtained his MSc degree in Agriculture from University of Agriculture (Faisalabad). He began his teaching career as a lecturer at Aitchison College, Lahore, but soon joined Rehabilitation Department where he worked as Deputy Settlement Commissioner. Later, he received his master's degree from Kansas State University and completed a PhD degree within three years at the University of Wisconsin, returning to Pakistan to join as Principal of Aitchison College, Lahore. Later, he was appointed Vice-chancellor of University of Agriculture, Faisalabad for three years. Thereafter, he joined the Punjab Agriculture Development Corporation as a managing director. This was followed by his appointment as Secretary of the Punjab Animal Care Department in Pakistan. He finally retired as Secretary of the Agriculture Department in Punjab. During all these years, Rasool also represented Pakistan in numerous international conferences, seminars, and delegations. Rasool was also the Honorary Secretary of Pakistan Association of Science and was the first Asian ever to receive the International Alumni Medallion Award from Kansas State University, which was called the 'Life Achievement Award'. He was recipient of a number of distinctions and "Gold Medals".

As a sportsman (1956–63)
Rasool was the captain of university hockey team and won inter-university tournament championships. Later he was included as a member of the Pakistan National Hockey Team and played many international matches. He was a member of the team at the Melbourne Olympics in 1956 where Pakistan received the Olympic silver medal. Two years later, he represented Pakistan in Asian Games Hockey, held in Tokyo, and received silver medal. In 1960, Rasool captained the Pakistan Hockey Team in the Rome Olympics and won an Olympic gold medal by defeating its arch-rival India in the finals. In 1962, Rasool again was the captain of the Pakistan Hockey Team that participated in Asian Games Hockey, held in Jakarta. He once more led his team to victory and won a gold medal for Pakistan by defeating India in the finals. After retirement from active hockey, Rasool was appointed first as Secretary and later as President of the Pakistan Hockey Federation (PHF). He was also the Selection Committee chairman.

Awards and recognition
Pride of Performance Award by the President of Pakistan in 1970

Death
Chaudhry Ghulam Rasool died in 1991. One of his sons, Akhtar Rasool was also an international hockey player who captained the Pakistan Hockey Team in the 1982 World Cup competition and won a gold medal for Pakistan by defeating India in the finals.

References

External links
 

1931 births
1991 deaths
Pakistani educational theorists
Pakistani male field hockey players
Olympic field hockey players of Pakistan
Olympic gold medalists for Pakistan
Olympic silver medalists for Pakistan
Olympic medalists in field hockey
Medalists at the 1956 Summer Olympics
Medalists at the 1960 Summer Olympics
Field hockey players at the 1956 Summer Olympics
Field hockey players at the 1960 Summer Olympics
Asian Games medalists in field hockey
Field hockey players at the 1958 Asian Games
Field hockey players at the 1962 Asian Games
Sportspeople from Faisalabad
Recipients of the Pride of Performance
Asian Games gold medalists for Pakistan
Medalists at the 1962 Asian Games
Medalists at the 1958 Asian Games
Vice-Chancellors of the University of Agriculture, Faisalabad
University of Agriculture, Faisalabad alumni